The Eighth Army was a field army of the British Army during the Second World War. It was initially formed as the Western Army on 10 September 1941, in Egypt, before being renamed the Army of the Nile, and finally the Eighth Army on 26 September. It was created to better control the growing Allied forces based in Egypt and to direct their efforts to lift the siege of Tobruk via Operation Crusader.

It later directed Allied forces through the remaining engagements of the Western Desert campaign, oversaw part of the Allied effort during the Tunisian campaign, and finally led troops throughout the Italian campaign. During 1943, it made up part of the 18th Army Group before being assigned to the 15th Army Group (later, the Allied Armies in Italy). 

Throughout its various campaigns, it was a multi-national force. At various times, its units came from Australia, British India, Canada, Czechoslovakia, the Free French Forces, Greece, New Zealand, Poland, Rhodesia, South Africa, Mauritius, as well as the United Kingdom. Significant formations that the army controlled included the British V, X, XIII, and XXX Corps, as well as the I Canadian Corps and the II Polish Corps.

Background
The Suez Canal, located in Egypt, was seen as a vital throughway of the British Empire linking Britain with its colonial possessions in the east, especially British India. It also held economic and prestigious importance. To maintain this, Egypt was occupied in 1882 and a protectorate was subsequently established. During the inter-war period, the Middle East and the canal gained further importance as oil production expanded, in addition to the development of aerial links between Britain and British India. In 1935, British policy shifted to view Italy as the principle threat towards British interests in the Middle East, following the Italian military build-up and invasion of Ethiopia and their colonial ambitions. The Anglo-Egyptian treaty of 1936 followed before tensions simmered with a joint declaration, on 2 January 1937, by Italy and Britain to maintain the status quo around the Mediterranean. However, relations quickly deteriorated and British reinforcements started to be moved into Egypt.

On 10 June 1940, Italy entered the Second World War against the UK and, between 13–16 September, invaded Egypt. The Allied counterattack, Operation Compass, took place in December. Over the following weeks, the offensive expanded, destroyed the Italian 10th Army, and captured the Libyan province of Cyrenaica. The attack was undertaken by the Western Desert Force, which was renamed XIII Corps after the conclusion of the operation. After receiving reinforcements, Axis forces launched their own riposte that drove the main Allied force back into Egypt and destroyed the British 2nd Armoured Division in the process. A sizeable Australian-led force was, during the same Axis offensive, surrounded in the Libyan port of Tobruk. This led to the siege of Tobruk, which required the bulk of the Axis force and hindered their ability to conduct further offensives. On 15 May, Operation Brevity was launched as British forces, from inside Egypt, attacked towards the Egyptian–Libyan border area. This minor effort failed to meet its objectives and ended the following day. A small-scale German counterattack, at the end of the month, recaptured all terrain lost to Brevity. Operation Battleaxe, which started on 15 June, was a determined two-day Allied effort to advance from Egypt and lift the siege of Tobruk. Italian-German forces repulsed the assault, and no terrain was gained. Geopolitical considerations followed, as pressure built on the British commanders to launch a new offensive to break the siege. This factored in that the majority of the German military had been committed to their invasion of the Soviet Union and the want to show British forces were doing their part in bringing about the defeat of the Axis powers. Closer to the front and after months of political debate, it was decided that the Australian garrison in Tobruk had to be relieved. This took place between September and October, with the Australians being replaced by a garrison led by the British 70th Infantry Division.

History

Formation

During 1941, XIII Corps was the primary Allied formation in Egypt. The process of forming a second, initially known as the Armoured Corps and later XXX Corps (this corps would not become active until October 1941), had also started. Due to the increased size of allied forces in Egypt and the forming second corps, it was decided in September 1941 that a field army headquarters was needed to direct these formations. On 10 September, the Western Army headquarters was formed in Cairo. The name was subsequently changed to the Army of the Nile, before being redesignated as the Eighth Army on 26 September. Winston Churchill, the British Prime Minister, sometimes referred to the army as the Western Desert Force.

Churchill suggested General Henry Maitland Wilson for command of the army, but the final decision was left in the hands of General Sir Claude Auchinleck who commanded Middle East Command and oversaw all British-led forces in the region. Auchinleck selected Lieutenant-General Alan Cunningham, who had led the British effort from Kenya during the East African campaign. On 29 August 1941, due to the success he had achieved, he was ordered to Egypt to take command of the forming Eighth Army, which he did on 24 September. The Eighth Army was responsible for operations in the Western Desert and was supported by the existing command, British Troops in Egypt, that controlled the lines of communication, the Egyptian anti-aircraft defenses, as well as undertaking internal security behind the front.

A crusader shield was used as the insignia of the army. Per the Imperial War Museum (IWM), it was chosen as it related to the codename for the first offensive that was planned for the army to undertake: Operation Crusader. Initial variants of the design used red, although the IWM stated that "it is not clear how widely they were issued, if at all." Concerns that a red cross would be confused with the emblem of the International Red Cross led to a switch from red to gold for the army insignia. On some variants of the design, the cross was outlined in dark blue or black. 

The 7th Armoured Division, which formed part of the army, was nicknamed the Desert Rats after their choice of mascot and insignia. George Forty, a historian who has written about the division, commented that the fame of the 7th Armoured Division subsequently resulted in its nickname being "loosely attached to any member of the forces who served in the Western Desert." Robin Neillands, in his work on the Eighth Army, wrote "It is worth pointing out here that the term 'Desert Rat', though often used to describe any soldier of the Desert Army or the men who fought in Tobruk – the Australians have a 'Rats of Tobruk' Association – should strictly be applied only to the men of the British 7th Armoured Division".

North Africa

One of the first tasks undertaken by the Eighth Army, under the direction of Lieutenant-General William Holmes' XX Corps that had recently arrived in Egypt, was to conduct preliminary work on defensive positions at El Alamein. This lasted until late October, when the corps moved to the front and British Troops in Egypt took over responsibility of the defensive works.

From his appointment, Cunningham closely worked with Auchinleck to formulate the Operation Crusader plan, which was to retake Cyrenaica and lift the siege of Tobruk. On 18 November, the battle commenced. It saw the 118,000 men and 738 tanks of the Eighth Army, the main force coming from Egypt and including the Tobruk garrison, engage the Italian-German force of 119,000 men and 552 tanks. The fighting started on 18 November, and Crusader achieved its objectives by the end of the year. On 25 November, after a German counterattack into Egypt had been repulsed, Cunningham was dismissed by Auchinleck. His replacement was Auchinleck's deputy chief of the general staff, Major-General Neil Ritchie, who was chosen due to his familiarity with the Crusader plan. The official history of the campaign recorded that the decision was made due to Auchinleck perceiving Cunningham as being too defensive minded. This resulted in a loss of confidence over his "ability to press to the bitter end the offensive he had been ordered to continue." Evan McGilvray and Philip Warner, historians who have both wrote about Auchinleck, added additional factors such as Auchinleck's concern that Cunningham was stressed, exhausted, and had issues with his eyesight that would require time away from command. Michael Carver, who fought in the battle and was later a field marshal and historian, concurred with the health assessment. He also noted that while Cunningham was "an imaginative choice", it was later clear his "appointment was a mistake" due to his lack of experience and confidence in the mobile requirements of the fighting in North Africa. Neillands' highlighted that Ritchie was thrust into a position where he, a major-general, was now charged with overseeing those who outranked him. This was compounded by a lack of experience in controlling formations or desert fighting, and that for the ten-day period after his appointment, Auchinleck remained at Eighth Army headquarters and was effectively in command.

In February 1942 Rommel had regrouped his forces sufficiently to push the over-extended Eighth Army back to the Gazala line, just west of Tobruk. Both sides commenced a period of building their strength to launch new offensives but it was Rommel who took the initiative first, forcing the Eighth Army from the Gazala position. Ritchie proved unable to halt Rommel and was replaced when Auchinleck himself took direct command of the army. The Panzer Army Afrika were eventually stopped by Auchinleck at the First Battle of El Alamein. Auchinleck, wishing to pause and regroup the Eighth Army, which had expended a lot of its strength in halting Rommel, came under intense political pressure from Churchill to strike back immediately. However, he proved unable to build on his success at Alamein and was replaced as Commander-in-Chief Middle-East in August 1942 by General Harold Alexander and as Eighth Army commander by Lieutenant-General William Gott. Gott was killed in an air crash on his way to take up his command and so Lieutenant-General Bernard Montgomery was appointed in his place. Alexander and Montgomery were able to resist the pressure from Churchill, building the Army's strength and adding a pursuit formation, X Corps, to the Army's XIII and XXX Corps.

At the beginning of November 1942, the Eighth Army defeated Rommel in the decisive Second Battle of El Alamein, pursuing the defeated Axis army across Libya and reaching the Mareth defensive line on the Tunisian border in February 1943, where it came under the control of 18th Army Group. The Eighth Army outflanked the Mareth defences in March 1943 and after further fighting alongside the British First Army, the other 18th Army Group component which had been campaigning in Tunisia since November 1942, the Axis forces in North Africa surrendered in May 1943.

Italian Campaign

The Eighth Army then participated in the Italian Campaign which began with the Allied invasion of the island of Sicily, code-named Operation Husky. When the Allies subsequently invaded mainland Italy, elements of the Eighth Army landed in the 'toe' of Italy in Operation Baytown and at Taranto in Operation Slapstick. After linking its left flank with the U.S. Fifth Army, led by General Mark W. Clark, which had landed at Salerno on the west coast of Italy south of Naples, the Eighth Army continued fighting its way up Italy on the eastern flank of the Allied forces. Together these two armies made up the Allied Armies in Italy (later redesigned 15th Army Group, under General Sir Harold Alexander.

At the end of 1943, General Montgomery was transferred to Britain to begin preparations for Operation Overlord. Command of the Eighth Army was given to Lieutenant-General Oliver Leese, previously the commander of XXX Corps, which was being returned to England.

Following three unsuccessful attempts in early 1944 by the U.S. Fifth Army to break through the German defensive positions known to the Allies as the Winter Line, the Eighth Army was covertly switched from the Adriatic coast in April 1944 to concentrate all forces, except the V Corps, on the western side of the Apennine Mountains alongside the U.S. Fifth Army in order to mount a major offensive with them. This fourth Battle of Monte Cassino was successful with the Eighth Army breaking into central Italy and the Fifth Army entering Rome in early June.

After the Allied capture of Rome, the Eighth Army continued the fight northwards through central Italy to capture Florence. The end of the summer campaign found Allied forces butting up against the Gothic Line. The Eighth Army returned to the Adriatic coast and succeeded in forcing the Gothic line defences, but ultimately the Allied forces could not break into the Po valley before the onset of winter forced an end to serious offensive operations. During October, Leese was reassigned to South East Asia Command, and Lieutenant-General Sir Richard L. McCreery, who had previously commanded X Corps, replaced him.

The final offensive in Italy saw the Eighth Army back in action. Working in conjunction with the U.S. Fifth Army, now commanded by Lucian K. Truscott, on its left flank, it cut off and destroyed, (during April), large parts of the opposing Army Group C defending Bologna and then made a rapid advance through northeast Italy and into Austria. Problems occurred where British and Yugoslavian forces met. Josip Broz Tito's forces were intent on securing control of the area of Venezia Giulia. They arrived before British forces and were very active in trying to prevent the establishment of military government in the manner that had applied to most of the rest of Italy. They even went as far as to restrict supplies through to the British zone of occupation in Austria and tried to take over part of that country as well. On 2 May 1945, the 2nd New Zealand Division of the Eighth Army liberated Trieste, and that same day, the Yugoslav Fourth Army, together with Slovene 9th Corpus NOV entered the town. During the fighting on the Italian Front the Eighth Army had, from 3 September 1943 until 2 May 1945, suffered 123,254 casualties.

Aftermath
At the end of the war, the army moved into Austria and became part of the Allied-occupation force. On 29 July 1945, the army was disbanded and its forces were used to form the command British Troops Austria. The new command maintained the gold crusader cross insignia of the Eighth Army.

General officer commanding

Veterans
After the war, veterans from the Eighth Army organized Annual Reunions at the Royal Albert Hall. Then, in the late 1970s, the Eighth Army Veterans Association was formed. At the height of its membership, there were over 35 branches, with a particular strength in the North West of the UK.

Order of Battle
 Crusader
 Gazala
 Alam el Halfa
 Second Battle of El Alamein
 Mareth Line
 Wadi Akarit
 Invasion of Sicily
 Invasion of Italy
 Second Battle of Monte Cassino
 Diadem
 Moro River Campaign
 Gothic Line
 1945 Spring offensive

See also
 British military history of World War II
 Jewish Brigade
 The Third Man

Notes

References

External links

 A personal account of the 8th Army
 Eighth Army Deeds

Military units and formations established in 1941
Military units and formations disestablished in 1945
1941 establishments in the United Kingdom
1945 disestablishments in the United Kingdom
08
08
Military units and formations of the British Empire in World War II